The following is a list of the mayors of San Ignacio, Belize'':

References

San Ignacio, Belize
Mayors